Mga Kwento ni Marc Logan ( / ) was a Philippine reality television show by ABS-CBN it is the viral and social media and hosted by Marc Logan. It aired from August 9, 2014 to September 9, 2017, replacing the first season of The Vocie Kids and was replaced by Shake, Rattle & Roll: Sabado Specials.

Host
 Marc Logan
 Carl Emmanuel (tv show host) Carl Emmanuel
 Riza Mae Abonales (celebrity from ABS-CBN Cadiz Veijo)~Riza Mae Abonales

See also
 ABS-CBN News and Current Affairs 
 List of programs broadcast by ABS-CBN

ABS-CBN original programming
ABS-CBN News and Current Affairs shows
Philippine reality television series
2010s Philippine television series
2014 Philippine television series debuts
2017 Philippine television series endings
Filipino-language television shows